HD 142245 is a hierarchical triple star system about  away. 

The primary subgiant star HD 142245 A belongs to the spectral class of K0. Its age is much younger than Sun`s at 2.855 billion years. The primary star is slightly enriched by heavy elements, having 160% of solar abundance.

In 2014, the co-moving binary stellar companion HD 142245 BC was detected. It consists of pair of red dwarf stars with composite spectral class M1, orbiting each other on 4 AU orbit.

No other stellar companions were found at projected separations from 5.48 to 153.34 AU around HD 142245 A.

Planetary system
In 2011 one superjovian planet HD 142245 A b on a mildly eccentric orbit around star HD 142245 A was discovered utilizing the radial velocity method.

References

Serpens (constellation)
Planetary systems with one confirmed planet
Multi-star planetary systems
J15525629+1525507
077783
Durchmusterung objects
142245
K-type subgiants
M-type main-sequence stars